Space Box: 1970 & Beyond (Space, Krautrock & Acid Trips) is a various artists compilation album released on August 20, 1996 by Cleopatra Records.

Reception

AllMusic gave Space Box: 1970 & Beyond (Space, Krautrock & Acid Trips) three out of five stars and said the album "experimental music that is oddly limited, working the same vibe, if not the same sound." The critic went on to say "even though the set is well compiled and contains some fine songs (Faust and Gong sound particularly good), there's no denying that there is a limited audience for this, even among prog-rock fans."

Track listing

Personnel
Adapted from the Space Box: 1970 & Beyond (Space, Krautrock & Acid Trips) liner notes.

 Dave Thompson – liner notes
 Eunah Lee – design

Release history

References

External links 
 Space Box - 1970 & Beyond (Space, Krautrock & Acid Trips) at Discogs (list of releases)

1996 compilation albums
Cleopatra Records compilation albums